The Day Time Ended is a 1980 American science fiction film directed by John 'Bud' Cardos and starring Jim Davis, Christopher Mitchum and Dorothy Malone.

The film was originally titled Earth's Final Fury; this was changed to Vortex, which was considered more likely to sell tickets. The final title came for unknown reasons.

Plot
A small family relocates to the Sonoran Desert to be closer to the grandparents of the family. Though there are news reports of a spectacular triple supernova and the young granddaughter has seen a glowing alien construction behind the barn, the family is at ease until, one night, a UFO soars overhead and appears to land in the nearby hills. Apparently, the triple supernova has opened a rift in space and time.
The family finds that their electrical appliances no longer function, and the youngest daughter of the family has a telepathic encounter with an extraterrestrial. The grandmother, too, sees one of these diminutive creatures beckoning to her, but it soon vanishes.

The grandfather, while trying to start the car, sees that a strange animal is approaching from the distance. The grandfather goes back inside and informs the family that something is coming; before long, a variety of horrific, alien monsters (all of these creatures being of a reptilian or amphibious nature) are proceeding to slaughter each other outside the house; some are trying to break in and kill the family. After a few moments, the UFO appears again and teleports the creatures to a different place. The family take this opportunity to escape to the barn. The family become separated from one another and each hides until sunrise, where they find that they have been launched thousands of years into the future. They meet up with the daughter, who had become separated from the family during one of the time-warp events. She tells them that everything is going to be fine now. After walking across the desert, they finally see a domed city in the distance, and decide to seek refuge there. The grandfather proclaims that there must be a purpose to all of this. The family walks towards the city.

Cast

Production
The film was originally conceived by script writers Steve Neill, Paul Gentry, and Wayne Schmidt. The three offered a script for another project to producer Charles Band, who thought it was too expensive to make but offered to produce a science-fiction film if it was based in one or two locations. The music score was done by Richard Band, Charles' brother. It was his first orchestral score, going to London to record with New London Symphony. 45 to 50 minutes of music was recorded during the six hour session. Months later, record label Varèse Sarabande contacted Band to make it a digital album, resulting it becoming the first digital soundtrack, beating out Star Trek: The Motion Picture by two weeks.

Release
The movie was released on video cassette in 1997 under Charles Bands' Full Moon Studios as part of their "Cult Video" collection.

Reception

In Creature Feature, the movie received 2 out of 5 stars, finding the effects nice and the cast watchable, but the story slight. Bill Warren from Fantasy Newsletter criticized the film for having no story coherence, as well as speaking negative of the stop-motion animation for having the wrong "movement-to-frame ratio", making the final result look like it was shot underwater. TV Guide gave it one star, calling it "derivative" and "overly ambitious" while giving specific criticism towards its special effects and stop-motion animations. Alan Jones for Radio Times also gave it one star, comparing the special effects to cardboard while calling the movie a "crudely assembled affair". In 1980, Marcy Lafferty was nominated for "Best Supporting Actress" at the 7th Saturn Awards, but lost to Veronica Cartwright for Alien.

Mystery Science Theater 3000
The film is one of six movies featured in Season 12 of Mystery Science Theater 3000.

References

External links
 
 
 
 

1980 animated films
1980 films
1980 science fiction films
American science fiction films
1980s English-language films
Films using stop-motion animation
Films directed by John Cardos
Films scored by Richard Band
Films with screenplays by David Schmoeller
1980s American films